Ben Piazza (July 30, 1933 – September 7, 1991) was an American actor.

Life and career
Piazza made his film debut in Sidney J. Furie's Canadian film A Dangerous Age (1959) followed by his Hollywood debut in The Hanging Tree (1959). Though he signed contracts with Warner Bros. and Gary Cooper's production companies for five years, he did not make another film until No Exit (1962).

A prolific television and film character actor, Piazza is perhaps most widely recognized as the wealthy restaurant patron in John Landis' 1980 comedy hit The Blues Brothers from whom Jake (John Belushi) offers to purchase his wife and daughter. Prior to that, he also played the violent boyfriend who scars Liza Minnelli's character's face in Otto Preminger's Tell Me That You Love Me, Junie Moon (1970). Piazza's other film appearances include The Candy Snatchers (1973); Piazza played a dramatic role in an episode of Barnaby Jones, titled “Bond of Fear” (04/15/1975),The Bad News Bears (1976), I Never Promised You a Rose Garden (1977), Nightwing (1979), Peter Bogdanovich's Mask (1985), Clean and Sober (1988), and Guilty by Suspicion (1991), in which he portrayed Hollywood film director/mogul Darryl F. Zanuck.  In 1986, Piazza had a three-month stint on the daytime soap opera Santa Barbara as Dr. A.L. Rawlings.
Piazza also played the role of Walt Driscoll in the sixth season of Dallas (1978 TV series), between 1982 and 1983. 

Piazza also wrote plays and a novel, The Exact and Very Strange Truth (1964), a coming-of-age story about an Italian-American boy in Little Rock, Arkansas, which was Piazza's hometown. However, Ben wrote in the book's introduction that any resemblance between the characters and real people was “irrelevant”, although the parallels to his own life were unmistakable. Piazza dedicated the book to openly gay playwright Edward Albee, who was a close friend.

Personal life and death
Piazza was married to actress Dolores Dorn from 1967 until 1979. Piazza was in a committed relationship with Wayne Tripp, from 1973 until Piazza died of AIDS-related cancer in 1991.

Filmography

References

Demetria Fulton; reviewed Piazza in Barnaby Jones episode “Bond of Fear”.

External links
 
 
  (juvenile credits)
 
 Ben Piazza at the University of Wisconsin's Actors Studio audio collection

1933 births
1991 deaths
American male film actors
American male television actors
Male actors from Little Rock, Arkansas
LGBT male actors
American LGBT actors
AIDS-related deaths in California
20th-century American male actors
Burials at Forest Lawn Memorial Park (Glendale)
Little Rock Central High School alumni
LGBT people from Arkansas
20th-century LGBT people